Carmina Riego Ramírez (born 24 March 1964) is a Chilean actress and cultural manager.

She has played diverse charismatic and popular characters in telenovelas, occasionally in the comedy genre, and is best known for the role of Esmeralda Peralta in Amores de Mercado (2001).

Biography
Carmina Riego is a graduate of the University of Chile's School of Acting and Theater Design, where she obtained a Bachelor of Arts degree with mention in theater in 1993.

These productions have been recognized by critics and the public, both in Chile and abroad.

Her television debut was in the Televisión Nacional de Chile (TVN) telenovela Aquelarre (1999). Due to her positive reception in this, she was hired to be part of the staff of director María Eugenia Rencoret, in the dramatic area of public television, where she began to stand out for her versatility when playing charismatic and popular roles in comedic telenovelas.

In 2001 she took part in Amores de Mercado (2001), where her character managed to maintain popularity throughout the telenovela's broadcast. In this show she shared credits with Malucha Pinto and Mariana Loyola, playing the Peralta sisters. In 2005 she starred in the sitcom , with Patricia López.

Later she was summoned for La chúcara, where she played the mother of the protagonist (Antonia Santa María), a role that brought her back to telenovelas after five years working in other genres.

Filmography

Films

Telenovelas

Other TV series and miniseries

Theater
 La Gorda by Ramón Griffero
 Río abajo by Ramón Griffero, debuted at Chilean National Theater, 1995
 Almuerzo de mediodía by Ramón Griffero, 1999
 Bukowski, 2000
 Petrópolis, 2002
 Santiago High Tech by Cristián Soto, 2002
 La Habana – Madrid by Julio Cid, dir.: Maritza Rodríguez, debuted at Teatro San Ginés, 2002
 Las horas previas, 2004
 Acassuso by Rafael Spregelburd, dir.: 
 Medusa by Ximena Carrera, dir.: Sebastián Vila
 El Taller by Nona Fernández, dir.: Marcelo Leonart
 La mujer que estafó al Viejo Pascuero by Carla Zúñiga, dir.: Daniela Aguayo, debuted at Centro GAM, 2013
 Lucía, Centro GAM, 2015
 99 La Morgue by Ramón Griffero, 2016
 Liceo de niñas, Centro GAM, 2016
 Parecido a la felicidad, 2016
 Piel de oveja, 2018

References

External links
 

1964 births
20th-century Chilean actresses
21st-century Chilean actresses
Actresses from Santiago
Chilean film actresses
Chilean stage actresses
Chilean telenovela actresses
Living people
University of Chile alumni